Florea Dumitrache Stadium is a multi-use stadium in Bucharest, Romania. It is the home ground of Dinamo București (rugby). It holds 1,500 people. It is named after Dinamo București and Romania legend, Florea Dumitrache (1948–2007). This was also the home ground of Victoria București, then being named Victoria Stadium.

FC Dinamo București
Football venues in Romania
Sports venues in Bucharest
Rugby union stadiums in Romania